City Vision is a centre-left coalition of two political parties, the New Zealand Labour Party and the Green Party of Aotearoa New Zealand, and community independents who contest Auckland Council (and previously Auckland City and Auckland Regional Council) elections every three years. They have usually caucused in affiliation with Labour Party councillors and progressive independents.

History 
City Vision originated in 1998 as a centre-left electoral ticket representing the local Labour, Green parties, and other progressive candidates in the Auckland local council elections. It was formed to challenge the centre-right Citizens and Ratepayers Association (C&R), which had dominated control of the Auckland City Council since the C&R's formation in the 1930s. City Vision have traditionally held representation in the centre-west and south of Auckland City.

City Vision candidates gained partial control of the Auckland City Council with the appointment of their first leader Bruce Hucker as Deputy Mayor of Auckland City in the 1998–2001 Christine Fletcher Mayoral administration, but received an electoral setback in 2001 with the election of a John Banks/C&R led council.

City Vision and Labour formed a working majority after the 2004 elections (winning nine seats) plus the election of Dick Hubbard to the mayoralty, partnering with Action Hobson anti-motorway councillors to form a bloc of twelve out of twenty. This council term saw public discontent over rates rises and water-price rises, and public anger over accusations of wasteful spending, such as on overseas travel. This term was also marked by infighting inside City Vision, with the deposition of leader Bruce Hucker and his replacement by Labour Councillor Richard Northey, a former Labour MP.

City Vision lost the 2007 elections to a John Banks/Citizens-and-Ratepayers team, finding themselves reduced to three councillors, in addition to two Labour councillors also re-elected.

Richard Northey continued as the leader of the City Vision and Labour bloc on Auckland City's council from the 2007 elections until 2010.

In the 2010 elections, the first for the new Auckland Council, Cathy Casey won a seat for City Vision. Winning candidates endorsed by City Vision were Mike Lee for council and Len Brown for mayor. Labour won another two council seats. City Vision won the majority on two local boards: Waitemata Local Board, which includes the central business district, and Albert-Eden Local Board. They also held two seats on the Puketapapa Local Board under the affiliation Roskill Community Voice.

In the 2013 elections, Cathy Casey retained her council seat for City Vision. Winning candidates endorsed by City Vision were Mike Lee for council and Len Brown for mayor. City Vision and affiliates held the majority on three local boards: the majority was maintained on the Waitemata and Albert-Eden local boards while City Vision members gained a majority on the Puketapapa local board under the affiliation Roskill Community Voice.

In 2016, City Vision called for a total review of local voting, including evaluation of online voting feasibility and a single polling day.

During the 2022 Auckland local elections, City Vision candidate Julie Fairey was elected as a councillor for the Albert-Eden-Puketāpapa Ward. In addition, seven City Vision candidates were elected to local boards and three candidates to the Portage Licensing Trust.

Auckland local elections

Current representatives

Councillors
City Vision candidates who were elected as ward councillors in 2022:
 Julie Fairey – Albert-Eden-Puketāpapa ward

Local boards
City Vision candidates who were elected as local board members in 2022:
 Margi Watson – Albert-Eden Local Board
 Julia Maskill – Albert-Eden Local Board
 Christina Robertson – Albert-Eden Local Board
 Liv Roe – Albert-Eden Local Board
 Alexandra Bonham – Waitematā Local Board
 Anahera Rawiri – Waitematā Local Board
 Richard Northey – Waitematā Local Board

References

External links
 

Politics of the Auckland Region
Political groupings in New Zealand